Orest Vasylyovych Budyuk (born 23 August 1995) is a Ukrainian football player who last played for Speranța Nisporeni.

Club career
He made his Ukrainian Second League debut for FC Obolon-2 Kyiv on 5 August 2012 in a game against FC SKA Odesa as an 84th-minute substitute for Vitaly Onopko.

In June 2015, Budyuk moved to FC Cherkaskyi Dnipro on a free transfer. He made his competitive debut for the club on 3 June 2015, playing all ninety minutes of a 3-0 away victory in the Ukrainian First League over Enerhiya Nova Kakhovka.

In July 2018, Budyuk was sold to FC Arsenal Kyiv for a reported €25,000 fee. He made his league debut for the club on 14 September 2018, playing all ninety minutes in a 1-0 away defeat to FC Desna.

References

External links
 
 
 

1995 births
Living people
Ukrainian footballers
Ukrainian expatriate footballers
Ukraine youth international footballers
Association football goalkeepers
FC Obolon-2 Kyiv players
FC Mariupol players
FC Cherkashchyna players
FC Arsenal Kyiv players
FC Kremin Kremenchuk players
Speranța Nisporeni players
FC Olimpiya Savyntsi players
Moldovan Super Liga players
Expatriate footballers in Moldova
Ukrainian expatriate sportspeople in Moldova
Ukrainian Premier League players
Ukrainian First League players
Ukrainian Second League players
Sportspeople from Volyn Oblast